San Pedro de la Cueva Municipality is a municipality in Sonora in north-western Mexico.

Its seat is San Pedro de la Cueva.

The municipal area is 1,926.36 km2. and the population was 1,429 in 2005.

Neighboring municipalities are: Moctezuma Municipality and Tepache Municipality, in the north, Sahuaripa Municipality, in the east, Bacanora Municipality, in the south, and  Villa Pesqueira Municipality, in the southwest.

References

Municipalities of Sonora